Base Lake Dam is an embankment dam in Holly Springs, North Carolina which creates Bass Lake.

See also
Sunset Lake (Holly Springs, North Carolina)
Sunset Lake Dam (Holly Springs, North Carolina)
Wake County, North Carolina
Holly Springs, North Carolina

References

External links
Holly Springs, NC 
North Carolina Floodplain Mapping Information System 
 Bass Lake Flash Earth View  
National Inventory of Dams, North Carolina 

Dams in North Carolina
Buildings and structures in Wake County, North Carolina
United States local public utility dams